Pukeiti is a garden of international significance in Taranaki, on the western North Island of New Zealand. It is in a gap between two sections of the Egmont National Park, to the northwest of the main cone of Mount Taranaki, on a saddle between it and the small Kaitake Range which stretches towards Oakura. The garden named for the Pukeiti (literally 'little hill') lava dome which is nearby. It is listed as one of Taranaki's top 10 visitor attractions.

Founded in 1951 by William Douglas Cook (who also founded Eastwoodhill Arboretum, Ngatapa, Gisborne) and Russell Matthews, Pukeiti is now one of the country's top rhododendron gardens, run by the Taranaki Regional Council. Facilities include a visitor centre, cafe and covered walkways.

References

External links
 Pukeiti – Taranaki Regional Council

New Plymouth District
Gardens in New Zealand
Protected areas of Taranaki